Knights of Sidonia is a Japanese science fiction manga series by Tsutomu Nihei.  It debuted in Kodansha's magazine Afternoon June issue in 2009. Since then, 15 tankōbon have been released. The manga has been licensed in North America by Vertical, who released all volumes in English between February 5, 2013, and April 26, 2016.  The manga ended on September 25, 2015.

Volume list

References

Knights of Sidonia